Tank Marshall (born January 6, 1955) is a former American football defensive tackle. He played for the New York Jets in 1977.

References

1955 births
Living people
American football defensive tackles
Texas A&M Aggies football players
New York Jets players